Gallop Racer 2001, known in Japan as , is a horse racing video game developed and published by Tecmo, released in 2001 for the PlayStation 2.

Gameplay
In Gallop Racer 2001, there are several game modes: Practice (represents a single race), Season (starts by buying a horse for a year long racing) and Vs. (split-screen races for two players). During the race, the action can be seen from either watch or jockey mode with various number of camera angles.

Reception

The game received "average" reviews according to the review aggregation website Metacritic. Gary Whitta of NextGen said of the game, "It's unlikely to kick-start widespread U.S. interest in a strange Japanese genre, but as a break from the norm it's just the ticket." In Japan, Famitsu gave it a score of 26 out of 40.

References

External links
 

2001 video games
Arcade video games
Horse racing video games
Koei Tecmo franchises
PlayStation 2 games
PlayStation 2-only games
Tecmo games
Video game sequels
Video games developed in Japan
Video games set in 2001